Lesbian, gay, bisexual, and transgender (LGBT) people in Malaysia face significant challenges not experienced by non-LGBT residents. There are no LGBT rights in Malaysia, with sodomy a crime in the country, with laws strictly enforced. Muslims may also be additionally convicted in a court under sharia law with the possibility of a judicially sanctioned capital punishment for homosexuality. Extrajudicial murders of LGBT people have also occurred in the country.

In 2015, the Human Rights Watch (HRW) stated that "Discrimination against lesbian, gay, bisexual, and transgender (LGBT) people is pervasive in Malaysia." Over the years, there has also been cases of violence against individuals in Malaysia based on their sexual orientation, and are tolerated by the government. Conversion therapy is practiced regularly in the country and is openly promoted by politicians and religious leaders.

Social attitudes towards the LGBT community in the country are largely shaped by Islam, the official state religion of Malaysia, although a significant proportion of Malaysians of other religions such as Christians also holds strong homophobic views.

Legality of same-sex sexual acts
Malaysia retains its criminal ban on sodomy (including oral sex involving the penis), which was enacted in 1871 when it was under British colonial rule (British Malaya). It is broadly defined to include both heterosexual and homosexual acts, with possible punishments including fines, caning, and prison sentences of up to twenty years. A subsection of the Criminal Code also provides additional punishment for men convicted of "gross indecency with another male person". In addition to the secular law, Muslim citizens may also be charged in special Islamic courts.

There has been some public discussion about reforming the law so as to exempt private, non-commercial sexual acts between consenting adults. Some members of the major opposition party have expressed support for such a reform, most notably Latheefa Koya, but this is not the official position of the party. No political party or elected member of the Parliament has formally proposed such a reform.

In 1994, the government banned anyone who is homosexual, bisexual or transsexual from appearing in state-controlled media.

In 1995, the Religious Affairs Minister of the state of Selangor praised the Islamic Badar vigilante groups, who had organised in 1994, to assist in the arrest of 7,000 individuals for engaging in "unIslamic" activities such as homosexuality.

In 2005, the Royal Malaysian Navy (RMN) chief Mohd Anwar Mohd Nor stated that the Navy would never accept homosexuals.

In 2010, the Film Censorship Board of Malaysia announced it would only allow depiction of homosexual characters as long as the characters "repent" or die. In 2017, Malaysia tried to censor Beauty and the Beast over some gay moments but eventually relented and let the movie be shown. The censorship board also had no objections to the screening of Power Rangers even with a lesbian scene in the movie.

In May 2017, the LGBT pride march organised by Taylor's University planned in June was cancelled due to Islamist pressure. The event was condemned by pro-Islamist blogs because it was disrespectful to do in the Islamic holy month of Ramadan.

In September 2018, two women were convicted for attempting to have lesbian sex in a car parked in public area, and were fined 3,300 Malaysian ringgit and caned six times before an audience in a courtroom in Terengganu state. Prime Minister Mahathir Mohamad denounced the punishment, saying it "did not reflect the justice or compassion of Islam".

In May 2019, a gay bar in the capital Kuala Lumpur was raided by police and religious enforcement officials, while a transgender woman was beaten up by a group of assailants in Seremban, near Kuala Lumpur. The minister in charge of Islamic affairs also came under fire from activists and other ruling party lawmakers, after he ordered the removal of portraits of two LGBT activists from an art exhibition.

In November 2019, a court found five men guilty for "attempting" gay sex, under section 28 of Selangor's Sharia law, and sentenced them to fines, imprisonment and six strokes of the cane each. The five men were arrested during a 2018 raid on a private residence in Selangor, in which a total of 11 men were arrested.

In February 2021, a court declared that any state laws within Malaysia can not be in conflict or override with clear federal laws banning gay sex.

Decriminalization efforts
The Ban on Seksualiti Merdeka

In 2011, Seksualiti Merdeka (Independent Sexuality), an annual sexuality rights event, was centered around the theme of “Queer without Fear”. Publicity for the event featured videos of several Malaysian citizens proclaiming their queer identity, calling for the equality of LGBT rights. After publicizing the event, the Royal Malaysia Police released a statement banning the event, based on the premises of risking disturbance of public order and impeding on religious freedom. In 2014, Section 27 A(1)(C) of the Police Act, which was used to ban the event, was superseded by the Peaceful Assembly Act 2012 (PAA). This resulted in the ban on the event being lifted.

Justice For Sisters (JFS) Challenging the Cross-dressing Ban

In April 2015, Nisha Ayub, a transgender woman and activist, aided three Muslim transwomen in challenging the Sharia legislation outlawing males cross-dressing as females in the state of Negeri Sembilan through the JFS organisation. While the case was won in the Court of Appeal, the Federal Court later repealed the decision in October 2015.

Decriminalization Test Case

In May 2020, a man filed a challenge in the Federal Court against Islamic laws banning "intercourse against the order of nature" in Selangor state. On 25 February 2021, the Federal Court unanimously declared that the Selangor state law provision which made unnatural sex a Sharia offence was invalid as it contradicted the Federal Constitution and that such offences fall under Parliament's jurisdiction. The summary of the judgement was read out by Chief Justice, Tengku Maimun Tuan Mat.

Adoption and family planning

Based on the Adoption Act 1952 (Adoption Act) and the Registration of Adoption Act 1952 (ROAA), there is no restrictions for a single person to adopt regardless of sexual orientation or gender identity.

Gender identity and expression

Human Rights Watch reports that state-level Sharia (Islamic) laws prohibit cross-dressing, and transgender people "face arbitrary arrest, physical and sexual assault, imprisonment, discriminatory denial of health care and employment, and other abuses."

Transgender individuals have often been arrested by police officers under the civil laws governing "public indecency", and if they are Muslim, can be further charged by religious officers under Sharia Laws for "impersonating" women. A 2014 Human Rights Watch report alleged that transgender people are subjected to "assault, extortion, and violations of their privacy rights" by police, and humiliation, physical and sexual assault by Religious Department officials.

In 1998, 45 Muslim transvestites were charged and convicted in court for dressing as women, and 23 more transgender persons faced similar fines and imprisonment in 1999.

It has been estimated that a large number of transgender persons are forced to work on the streets as commercial sex workers to earn a living.

In November 2014, three transgender women from the state of Negeri Sembilan arrested for cross-dressing via Sharia law successfully appealed for review of the judicial law at the Court of Appeal for appropriate clothing of people with gender dysphoria. Due to the lack of a mention of gender dysphoria and the lack of medical evidence for a state legal adviser's claim that transgender people were insane, the court unanimously declared the anti-cross-dressing Sharia law as void and violating the constitutional right of "freedom of expression, movement and the right to live in dignity and equality". On 8 October 2015, the Federal Court of Malaysia overturned the ruling on procedural grounds. The Court found that the three women should have obtained judicial permission of a Federal Court judge when they commenced their constitutional challenge. Although a High Court judge had granted permission in November 2011, the Federal Court ruled that it had done so erroneously.

In August 2016, the Kuala Lumpur High Court ordered the National Registration Department (NRD) to update a trans man’s information on his identity card to better reflect his gender identity and chosen name. The judge argued that "the plaintiff has a precious constitutional right to life under Article 5(1) of the Federal Constitution, and the concept of life under Article 5 must necessarily encompass the plaintiff’s right to live with dignity as a male and be legally accorded judicial recognition as a male." The NRD subsequently appealed the ruling.

Blood donation
Homosexuals and bisexuals are prohibited from  donating blood by the National Blood Centre of Malaysia. This policy seems to be gender neutral, since it doesn't explicitly mention the gender that is prohibited from donating blood.

Public opinion
A 2013 Pew Research Center opinion survey showed that only 9% of the Malaysian population believe homosexuality should be accepted by society, while 86% believe it should not. Malaysia was one of the countries in Asia polled with the least acceptance of homosexuality.

LGBT rights in Malaysian politics
There is no legal protection for LGBT individuals. A few MPs from the previous ruling coalition, Pakatan Harapan, have voiced support for LGBT rights, as has Marina Mahathir the daughter of former prime minister Mahathir Mohamad who called for an end to discrimination based on sexual orientations in 1998 and 1999. Parti Sosialis Malaysia is the only political party to openly support and defend the rights of LGBT people alongside other minority rights. A contrasting political force is the "People's Anti-Homosexual Voluntary Movement", created in 1998 to lobby for stricter criminal laws against homosexuality. It is a member of the former ruling party United Malays National Organisation (UMNO).

In March 2019, Minister of Tourism, Arts and Culture Mohammadin Ketapi denied the existence of LGBT people in Malaysia, telling German reporters in the 2019 ITB Berlin tourism trade fair: "I don't think we have anything like that in our country." However, he later posted a statement on Twitter saying that his statement referred to the non-existence of specific LGBT-focused tourist campaigns in the country. When a Women's Day march was held in Kuala Lumpur on the same month, it was condemned by government officials and the political parties of United Malays National Organisation (UMNO) and Malaysian Islamic Party (PAS) as the march involved LGBT rights among its demands.

In April 2019, Malaysian authorities were accused for intimidating gay rights activist Numan Afifi by questioning him in the police station about  a speech he made in the United Nations Human Rights Council (UNHRC) in Geneva in March 2019. The speech pointed out that Malaysia rejected the recommendations of a coalition of twelve Malaysian LGBT organizations on gender identity and sexual orientation.

In May 2019, George Clooney warned Malaysia and Indonesia against legislating a law allowing them to impose death penalty for homosexuality, as Brunei has legislated. The response of the Deputy Foreign Minister, Marzuki Yahya pointed out that Malaysia does not kill gay people, and will not resort to killing sexual minorities. He also said that though such lifestyles deviate from Islam, the government would not impose such a punishment on the group.

The position of former Malaysian Prime Minister Mahathir Mohamad 
During a lecture to students in a university in Bangkok, Thailand, in October 2018, Prime Minister Mahathir Mohamad stated that Malaysia would not "copy" Western nations' approach towards LGBT rights, indicating that these countries were exhibiting a disregard for the institutions of the traditional family and marriage, as the value system in Malaysia is good. In June 2019, he reiterated his stance, speaking at the Cambridge Union, he said that Malaysia cannot accept same-sex marriage or LGBT rights, saying “I don’t understand gay marriage. In Malaysia there are some things we cannot accept, even though it is seen as human rights in Western countries,” adding that same-sex marriage is a “regressive way of thinking” and that marriage was about having children and he claimed that the institution of marriage has almost been discarded.

In 2001, in his previous term as Prime Minister Mahathir Mohamad stated that the country will deport any visiting foreign cabinet ministers or diplomats who are gay. Mahathir also warned gay ministers in foreign countries not to bring along their partners while visiting the nation. Mahathir's daughter, Marina Mahathir, however has called for an end to discrimination based on sexual orientation.

Prosecution of Anwar Ibrahim

In 1998, Anwar Ibrahim was charged with corruption and sodomy. In 2000, he was sentenced to nine years for engaging in sodomy with his 19-year-old male chauffeur and his former male speech writer. Despite national and international protests, he was not released until he had served out four years of his sentence, until 2004, when the Federal Court of Malaysia acquitted him of all charges.

After his release, Anwar stated that he was innocent and the allegations were part of a government conspiracy to end his political career. He also felt that the national criminal laws against homosexuality ought to be reformed to protect consenting adults' rights to have a private life, although he also stated that same-sex marriage "is going a bit too far".

In 2007, former Prime Minister Mahathir Mohamad responded to a civil lawsuit filed by Anwar by stating that a homosexual should not hold public office in Malaysia and that he knew Anwar was a homosexual because Anwar's male chauffeur and a male speech writer both stated in court that they had had sexual relations with Anwar.

In July 2008, Anwar was arrested again, accused of sodomy with a male former aide. The arrest came shortly after Anwar claimed to be in a position to challenge the governing coalition after the opposition's successes in the March elections. However, he was released on bail and won the campaign for his former seat in Parliament.

In the beginning of 2015, Anwar was again arrested and sentenced to five years in prison.

On 16 May 2018, Malaysia's former king, Sultan Muhammad V, officially pardoned Anwar after meeting with members of the pardons board and Prime Minister Mahathir Mohamad. The full royal pardon was made on the basis of a "miscarriage of justice".

The position of Najib Razak
Ex-Malaysian Prime Minister Najib Razak made clear in a speech in August 2015 at an international Islamic moderation seminar in Selangor, that he believed Malaysia should not support LGBT rights. Najib stated that his administration will do its best to uphold human rights but only within the confines of Islam and that Malaysia cannot defend the more "extreme aspect of human rights", such as gay, lesbian and transsexual rights. This prompted Human Rights Watch to suggest that Malaysia withdraw from the United Nations if the government was not serious about upholding human rights for all.

LGBT-supporting organisations in Malaysia

Malaysia does not have a national organisation committed to LGBT rights. Instead, a loose coalition of non-governmental organisations, artists, and individuals organise the annual sexuality rights festival Seksualiti Merdeka. Seksualiti Merdeka, meaning "Independent Sexuality", is an annual festival consisting of talks, performances, screenings, workshops, and forums to promote sexuality rights as a human right, to empower marginalised individuals and communities, and to create platforms for advocacy. Besides organising the programmes of this annual festival, members of this coalition are also involved in letter-writing campaigns, organising regular film screenings and discussions, academic advocacy and training of trainers. However, the Government has attempted to prevent these events from happening since 2011.

The groups involved in Seksualiti Merdeka have also on their own advocated for the rights of LGBT within the framework of human rights advocacy. These include established human rights organisations such as the Human Rights Committee of the Malaysian Bar, SUARAM, PT Foundation, KRYSS, Women's Candidacy Initiative, Persatuan Kesedaran Komuniti Selangor (EMPOWER), Purple Lab, Matahari Books, and The Annexe Gallery.

Several other groups such as Sisters in Islam, Women's Aid Organisation, and Amnesty International also have dealt with sexual orientation issues within their public health advocacy. The focus on AIDS-HIV education has allowed for more public discussion of sexual orientation, gender identity and human rights. PT Foundation, originally called Pink Triangle, focuses on "providing HIV/AIDS education, prevention, care and support programs, sexuality awareness and empowerment programs for vulnerable communities in Malaysia". The communities include MSM (men who have sex with men), transgender, sex workers, drug users, and people living with HIV. They are joined by other organisations, such as LPG (for gay men) and OutDo (for lesbians), which organise regular activities for their target communities.

HIV/AIDS issues

While not solely a problem for LGBT people, the public health response to AIDS-HIV has required greater public discussion of topics such as human sexuality, gender roles, and sexual orientation.

Since the first official case of AIDS appeared in the nation in 1985, the government has been under more pressure to promote education and prevention campaigns as some experts have suggested that the number of Malaysians infected with HIV could go as high as 300,000 by the year 2015.

In 2006, the Government launched a new comprehensive public campaign that includes therapy and needle exchange programs for drug addicts and free medications provided at government clinics. However, in 2007, Malaysia's Ministry of Health was banned from advocating the use of condoms to prevent the spread of the disease due to a concern that such a campaign would be equated with a governmental endorsement of sexual conduct outside of a legal marriage.

By state

Selangor
In 2021, a Malay man who was arrested on sodomy charges (which he denied), filed a lawsuit against the state government of Selangor. It was unanimously ruled by the court that the Islamic provision used in the state was unconstitutional and state authorities had no power to enact the law. LGBT rights activists praised the ruling as "historic".

Summary table

See also

 Human rights in Malaysia
 LGBT rights in Asia
 Seksualiti Merdeka
 Asmara Songsang
 PT Foundation

References

Further reading
"Advancing LGBT rights in Malaysia – Jackson Yee CS" (opinion). The Malaysian Insider. 20 May 2014.

External links
 Pink Triangle Foundation us
 queermalaysians

Political movements in Malaysia
 
Human rights in Malaysia
Persecution of LGBT people